La vida alegre is a 1987 Spanish comedy film directed and written by Fernando Colomo. It stars Veronica Forqué, Antonio Resines, Ana Obregón, Guillermo Montesinos, Massiel and Miguel Rellán.

Plot 
Ana is a doctor. Against the opinion of her husband, Antonio, also a doctor, she starts working at a centre of venereal diseases. There, she meets eccentric people from the lower strata of the society.

Cast

Production 
La vida alegre was written by the director Fernando Colomo, who took inspiration on the experiences of his sister Concepción, a doctor specialist in dermatology and venereology. The film was produced by El Catalejo P.C. Shot in Madrid from November to December 1986, shooting locations included the Centro District.  worked as director of photography. The scored was performed by the band . The total budget amounted to around 95 million ₧.

Release 
Distributed by Iberoamericana Films Producción, the film premiered on 14 April 1987. It grossed  826,788 viewers and a revenue of 260 million ₧.

Awards and nominations 

|-
| align = "center" | 1988 || rowspan = "2" | 2nd Goya Awards || Best Actress || Verónica Forqué ||  || align = "center" | 
|}

See also 
 List of Spanish films of 1987

References 
Citations

Bibliography
 
 

Spanish comedy films
1980s Spanish-language films
1987 films
Films shot in Madrid
Films about physicians
Films about sexually transmitted diseases
Films directed by Fernando Colomo